The 2004 Cincinnati Bengals season was the team's 37th year in professional football and its 35th with the National Football League (NFL). The Bengals began to focus on the future, trading All-Pro running back Corey Dillon to the New England Patriots. That cleared the way for Rudi Johnson to start at running back. Carson Palmer was given the starting quarterback job. Palmer and the young Bengals would struggle early, losing five of their first seven games. As the season wore on, the Bengals began to hit their stride, as they climbed back to .500, at 6–6, before a sprained knee sent Palmer to the sidelines during a 35–28 road loss to the eventual Super Bowl champion New England Patriots.

With wins in their final two games, the Bengals would finish 8–8 for the second year in a row. Rudi Johnson finished sixth in the NFL in rushing with 1,454 yards, giving Bengals fans hope for the future.

This season would see the Bengals make their first appearance on Monday Night Football since 1992, a win at home against the Denver Broncos on October 25.

Offseason

NFL Draft

Personnel

Roster

Regular season
The 2004 season constituted the first time since 1991 that the Bengals played the Washington Redskins, and the match produced their first ever away win over that franchise. The reason for this is that before the admission of the Texans in 2002, NFL scheduling formulas for games outside a team’s division were much more influenced by table position during the previous season.

Schedule

Note: Intra-divisional opponents are in bold text

Season summary

Week 2

Standings

Team leaders

Passing

Rushing

Receiving

Defensive

Kicking and punting

Special teams

Awards and records

Pro Bowl Selections
 Rudi Johnson RB, AFC Pro-Bowl Selection
 Chad Johnson WR, AFC Pro-Bowl Selection
 Willie Anderson RT, AFC Pro-Bowl Selection
 Tory James CB, AFC Pro-Bowl Selection

All-Pro Award
 Willie Anderson RT, 1st Team All-Pro

Milestones
 Rudi Johnson, 1st 1000 yard rushing season (1,454 yards)
 Chad Johnson, 3rd 1000 yard receiving season (1,274 yards)

NFL Records
 2nd Highest scoring regular season game in NFL history (58-48 win over the Cleveland Browns on November 28, 2004)

References

External links

 
 2004 Cincinnati Bengals at Pro-Football-Reference.com

Cincinnati Bengals
Cincinnati Bengals seasons
Cincin